Tadley Calleva Football Club are a football club based in Tadley, Hampshire, England. The club is affiliated to the Hampshire Football Association. The club's name of Calleva comes from the nearby Roman Town of Calleva Atrebatum, based just outside Silchester.

History
The club was formed as Tadley F.C. in 1989. They joined the Hampshire League Division Three in 1994, finishing runners-up in 1995–96, gaining promotion to Division Two. The club changed its name to Tadley Town F.C. in 1999 and joined Division One upon reorganisation. In 2004, they changed to their present name and entered the Wessex Football League Division Three. Division Three was renamed Division Two in 2006, and the club finished runners-up in 2007. In the 2007–08, they won the Wessex League Division One title but were denied promotion as their ground did not meet the requirements for the Premier Division. Since then the team has remained in Division One.

Tadley has had a football team since the early 1900’s. In the modern era the team was re-formed in 1989 and played in the Basingstoke and North Hants Leagues before winning promotion to the Hampshire League. The club was formed as Tadley F.C. in 1989.They joined the Hampshire League Division Three in 1994, finishing runners-up in 1995–96, gaining promotion to Division Two. The club changed its name to Tadley Town F.C. in 1999 and joined Division One upon re-organisation. In 2004, they changed their name to their present name and entered the Wessex Football League Division Three. 

Division Three was re-named Division Two in 2006, and the club finished runners-up in 2007. In the 2007–08 season, they won the Wessex League Division One title but were denied promotion as their ground did not meet the requirements for the Premier Division. The Reserve side was also highly successful in the same season by taking the Wessex Combination League title. 

Since then the team has remained in Division One and has steadily been making progress on and off the field year on year. They narrowly missed out on promotion in 2014-15 and 2015-16 respectively by finishing in 3rd position in both seasons. 

In the 2010–11 campaign they reached the final of the Basingstoke Senior Cup losing to Thatcham Town 4–1. The club then went on to win the same cup in 2013-14 beating local rivals AFC Aldermaston 3-2 (aet) in the final. In September 2014, the club recorded probably the best result of its modern history, defeating Conference South Basingstoke Town on penalties in the Hampshire FA Senior Cup at The Camrose after a 2-2 draw in 90 minutes. 

The club had its best run in the FA Vase in season 2015-16 reaching the 3rd round proper before eventually being knocked out 4-2 after a replay and extra-time against Newport (IoW) from the Wessex Premier Division. 

They have also reached the final of the North Hants Senior Cup in the last two seasons: losing out 3-1 to local rivals Whitchurch United in 2016-17, again at The Camrose, and then 5-4 on penalties to Andover New Street in 2017-18 at Longmeadow after a 3-3 draw in normal time. 

The club achieved its ambition of gaining promotion to the Wessex League Premier Division in 2018-19 season - the highest level (Step 5) that the club has competed at. The goal is to consolidate its position on the field and to make significant progress with the infrastructure off the field. Tadley finished 8th in their first season. 

Tadley were lying 13th after 28 games in season in 2019-20. The season finished in March due to Coronavirus. 

In 2020-21 Tadley had a change in Secretary, after many years Dean Newton step down. The club would like to place on record are thanks for the work and time put in by Dean. After no one come forward, Wayne Chivers took it up on a full-time basis.

In 2020/21 Tadley had their best run in the FA cup in the club’s history, team manager Adam Clarke saw the club reach the First qualifying round. 

In 2021/22 Tadley Calleva has seen a chance in league and management, the club has joined the Combined Counties League North. This was due to the FA restructuring at Steps 4-6. Adam Clarke had to step down due to work commitments, we wished Adam the best of luck. Joe Lawler & Ben Dillon was named as joint first team managers for the coming season. In 2021/22 season the club came 12th after a slow start. In season 2022/23 we were moved to the Combined Counties League South.

Ground
Tadley Calleva play their home games at Barlows Park, Silchester Road, Tadley, Hampshire, RG26 3PX.

Barlows Park was built on an old landfill site and was opened in 2007. The ground has pitch fencing, hard standing and flood lights. It is managed by the Barlow's Park Management Association and had once been home to Reading F.C. Women.

Honours

League honours
Wessex League Division One
Champions 2007–08
Wessex League Division Two
Runners-up 2006–07
Hampshire League Division Three
Runners-up 1995–96

Cup honours
Basingstoke Senior Cup:
 Winners (1): 2013–14
 Runners up (1): 2010–11

Records
Highest League Position: 1st in Wessex League Division One 2007–08
FA Cup best performance:  First qualifying round 2020–21
FA Vase best performance: Third round proper 2015-16
Record Attendance: 652 (v AFC Bournemouth Development), Hampshire Cup Round 3, 21 February 2023

References

External links
Official club website
https://www.tadleycalleva.com/

Football clubs in England
Football clubs in Hampshire
Association football clubs established in 1989
1989 establishments in England
Tadley
North Hants League
Hampshire League
Wessex Football League
Combined Counties Football League